Jindřich Stehlík (born in Brno on 30 June 1992) is a Czech football player who currently plays for 1. SC Znojmo on loan from FC Zbrojovka Brno.

References
 Profile at FC Zbrojovka Brno official site

1992 births
Living people
Czech footballers
Czech First League players
FC Zbrojovka Brno players
Association football forwards
Footballers from Brno